David William Kosoof (born 26 July 1978) is a New Zealand field hockey player, who was a member of the New Zealand men's national field hockey team (the Black Sticks Men) between 2000 and 2009.

Kosoof lives in Red Beach on the Hibiscus Coast north of Auckland, His current occupation is working as the Coachforce officer at North Harbour Hockey Association.

References

External links
 

1978 births
Living people
New Zealand male field hockey players
2002 Men's Hockey World Cup players
Field hockey players at the 2004 Summer Olympics
Field hockey players at the 2008 Summer Olympics
Olympic field hockey players of New Zealand
Sportspeople from Rotorua
Commonwealth Games silver medallists for New Zealand
Commonwealth Games medallists in field hockey
Field hockey players at the 2002 Commonwealth Games
20th-century New Zealand people
21st-century New Zealand people
Medallists at the 2002 Commonwealth Games